Bhopal railway station may refer to:

 Bhopal Junction railway station, a railway station in Madhya Pradesh, India
 Rani Kamlapati railway station, a railway station in Madhya Pradesh, India
 Sant Hirdaram Nagar railway station, a railway station in Madhya Pradesh, India
 Bhopal railway division, a railway division in Madhya Pradesh, India